Willy Pieper (born 9 July 1911, date of death unknown) was a Swiss sailor. He competed at the 1936 Summer Olympics and the 1952 Summer Olympics.

References

External links
 

1911 births
Year of death missing
Swiss male sailors (sport)
Olympic sailors of Switzerland
Sailors at the 1936 Summer Olympics – O-Jolle
Sailors at the 1952 Summer Olympics – Finn
Place of birth missing